The Widow Jones was an 1895 New York City stage musical comedy. Thomas Edison hired the play's stars, May Irwin and John Rice, to recreate the kiss seen in act 1 of the play for the 1896 short film, The Kiss, made in Edison's Kinetoscope process.

Songs 
"His Legs Are Assorted Sizes" (music by Geo. H. Wilder, lyrics by Lawrence J. Sheehan)
"I Love My Honey Yes I Do" (music and lyrics by Will C. Carleton)
"The New Bully" (music and lyrics by Charles E. Trevathan)

Notes

External links 

 
 The Kiss - the Edison film on YouTube (21 seconds)

1895 musicals
Broadway musicals